Joseph De Craecker (19 January 1891 – 23 October 1975) was a Belgian fencer. He won two silver medals in the team épée competitions at the 1920 and 1924 Summer Olympics.

References

1891 births
1975 deaths
Belgian male fencers
Belgian épée fencers
Olympic fencers of Belgium
Fencers at the 1920 Summer Olympics
Fencers at the 1924 Summer Olympics
Olympic silver medalists for Belgium
Olympic medalists in fencing
Medalists at the 1920 Summer Olympics
Medalists at the 1924 Summer Olympics